This is a list of the best selling singles, albums and as according to IRMA. Further listings can be found here.

Top Selling singles

Top Selling albums

Notes:
 *Compilation albums are not included.

References

2007 in Irish music
2007
Ireland top sellling